Selling Los Angeles is an American television series airing on HGTV. It features real estate brokers from Los Angeles in affluent areas who chronicle selling real estate to various clientele, some of whom are celebrities. Season 1 premiered in October 13, 2011  has been renewed by the network HGTV for four seasons. It is produced by Canadian production company, JV Productions Inc who also produces the show Selling New York in the same franchise. The West Coast show was inspired by the East Coast affiliated show Selling New York and later inspired a European spin-offs on HGTV titled Selling London. There are several celebrity real estate professionals who have appeared on the show.

References

External links
Series Website

HGTV original programming
English-language television shows
2010 American television series debuts